In chemistry, titanate usually refers to inorganic compounds composed of titanium oxides. 
Together with niobate, titanate salts form the Perovskite group.

In some cases, the term is used more generally for any titanium-containing anion, e.g. [TiCl6]2− and [Ti(CO)6]2−. This article focuses on the oxides.

Many kinds of titanium oxides are known, and some are commercially important. Typically these materials are white, diamagnetic, high-melting, and insoluble in water. They are often prepared at high temperatures, e.g. using tube furnaces, from titanium dioxide. In virtually all cases, titanium achieves octahedral coordination geometry.

Orthotitanates
Orthotitanates have the formula M2TiO4, where M is divalent. An example of such a material is magnesium titanate (Mg2TiO4), which adopts the spinel structure. Li2TiO3 is not considered an orthotitanate since it adopts the rock-salt structure and does not feature an identifiable titanium anion. Orthotitanates almost never feature identifiable TiO44− centres, an exception being Ba2TiO4.

Titanic acid and its esters
Also called orthotitanic acid or titanium hydroxide, the substance H4TiO4 is called titanic acid. This material, which is not well defined, is obtained by hydrolysis of TiCl4. The solid is unstable with respect to loss of water and formation of titanium dioxide. Esters of orthotitanic acid are known, however; one example being titanium isopropoxide. Esters derived from smaller alcohols adopt more complex structures wherein titanium does achieve octahedral coordination, e.g. Ti4(OCH3)16 or titanium tetramethoxide. It is a weak acid, if it can be isolated.

Metatitanates
The metatitanates have the formula MTiO3, where again M is divalent. They do not feature discrete TiO32− centres. Some, like the commercially important mineral ilmenite (FeTiO3), crystallize in the hexagonal close packing motif seen in corundum. Alternatively, some materials with the formula MTiO3 crystallize in the motif known as perovskite, which is also the name of the mineral form of calcium titanate (CaTiO3). Barium titanate is one such perovskite-structured titanate with ferroelectric properties.

Complex titanates
More complex titanates are also known, such as bismuth titanate, Bi4Ti3O12.

References

 
Transition metal oxyanions
Oxometallates